McDonald is a borough in Allegheny and Washington counties in the U.S. state of Pennsylvania, 18 miles (29 km) southwest of Pittsburgh. The population was 2,056 at the 2020 census. Of this, 1,661 were in Washington County, and 395 were in Allegheny County.

In the past, factories producing bottles, oil-well drilling tools, flour-mill products, etc., existed here. Oil and coal were and still are procured in the area. McDonald's government includes an elected mayor, an elected seven-member borough council and an appointed secretary-treasurer.  The borough's tax collector is also elected.  The mayor, council members and tax collector are all elected to four-year terms.  All of the council seats are at-large.

The borough is served by the Fort Cherry School District.

Geography
McDonald is located at  (40.370101, -80.232915).

According to the United States Census Bureau, the borough has a total area of 0.5 square mile (1.3 km2), all land.

Robinson Run, a tributary of Chartiers Creek, flows through the southeastern part of the Borough.

Surrounding neighborhoods
McDonald has four borders, including North Fayette Township to the north and northeast, South Fayette Township to the east, Cecil Township (Washington County) to the south and southwest, and Robinson Township (Washington County) to the west and northwest.

Government and politics

Demographics

As of the census of 2010, there were 2,149 people, 383 of whom lived in the Allegheny county part of the borough, 1,766 of whom lived in the Washington County part of the borough.

As of the census of 2000, there were 2,281 people, 1,021 households, and 607 families residing in the borough. The population density was 4,387.3 people per square mile (1,693.7/km2). There were 1,134 housing units at an average density of 2,181.1 per square mile (842.0/km2). The racial makeup of the borough was 92.15% White, 6.31% African American, 0.13% Native American, 0.04% Asian, 0.09% Pacific Islander, 0.18% from other races, and 1.10% from two or more races. Hispanic or Latino of any race were 0.26% of the population.

There were 1,021 households, out of which 24.9% had children under the age of 18 living with them, 43.8% were married couples living together, 11.8% had a female householder with no husband present, and 40.5% were non-families. 36.4% of all households were made up of individuals, and 18.4% had someone living alone who was 65 years of age or older. The average household size was 2.22 and the average family size was 2.90.

In the borough the population was spread out, with 21.6% under the age of 18, 6.8% from 18 to 24, 28.6% from 25 to 44, 23.8% from 45 to 64, and 19.2% who were 65 years of age or older. The median age was 40 years. For every 100 females, there were 91.0 males. For every 100 females age 18 and over, there were 86.7 males.

The median income for a household in the borough was $33,239, and the median income for a family was $45,878. Males had a median income of $35,484 versus $25,039 for females. The per capita income for the borough was $17,907. About 6.7% of families and 12.2% of the population were below the poverty line, including 18.7% of those under age 18 and 16.4% of those age 65 or over.

Newspapers
McDonald has been home to a few newspapers in its history.  "The Record" and "The Outlook" were early papers that became "The Record-Outlook."  "The Record-Outlook" eventually came to be owned by The Observer Publishing Company of Washington, PA.  After several years under this ownership, it was merged with The Burgettstown Enterprise and became "The Record-Enterprise."  This paper closed in 1999.

From 2000 to 2002 The Community Outlook Newspaper filled the void of losing the local paper for McDonald and surrounding areas. DIVA Publishing headed by Stefanie Crawford, Isaac Holeva and Karla Hons published the 32 page periodical in over 20 communities with its base focusing on McDonald and surrounding neighborhoods.

Since then, some business owners along the borough's main streets have periodically attempted to begin community newsletters or newspapers to assist in the promotion of local commerce.  The current attempt, first published in 2009, is called the "McDonald Area News."

Filmmaking
Two movies have been filmed in McDonald, Homecoming and Warrior. Both films were filmed at the Pitt Hotel Bar.

Notable people
 Tina Darragh - Poet
 Marvin Lewis - Former NFL coach
 Marty Schottenheimer - former NFL player and coach
 Jay Livingston - Oscar-winning songwriter
 Alan Livingston - former President of Capitol Records
 Barry Galbraith - Jazz guitarist

References

External links

Boroughs in Allegheny County, Pennsylvania
Boroughs in Washington County, Pennsylvania
Populated places established in 1865
Pittsburgh metropolitan area
1865 establishments in Pennsylvania